Gina Calleja (March 12, 1928 – March 7, 2017) was an author and illustrator of children's books in Canada.

Early life
Calleja was born Jean Gadsby in Lowestoft, England.  She studied art at Reading University and London University's Slade School of Fine Art.

Career
Gadsby married Joseph Calleja, a painter and sculptor from Malta, and the pair moved to Canada in 1958.  She worked as a secondary school teacher in Toronto.  In 1980 she created the illustrations for Caroline Beech's story, Peas again for lunch.  Soon after she illustrated two of Frank Etherington's stories, The Spaghetti Word Race and Those Words.

Calleja created her first children's book as an author in 1983, entitled Tobo hates purple.  She continued to write and illustrate over the next two decades; her most recent book is Great Food for Happy Kids in 2001.

Calleja died March 7, 2017.

Books
Peas Again for Lunch, 1980. (illustrator) 
The Spaghetti Word Race, 1981 (illustrator)
Those Words, 1982 (illustrator)
Tobo Hates Purple, 1983
Wizzo and the Cookie Babies, 1994
Bloor and Christie, 1998
Great Food for Happy Kids, 2001 (illustrator)

References

External links
WorldCat report
"Gina Calleja". Family placed obituary in the Toronto Star, March 10, 2017.

1928 births
2017 deaths
Canadian children's book illustrators
People from Lowestoft
English emigrants to Canada
Canadian expatriates in England
Alumni of the University of Reading
Alumni of the Slade School of Fine Art
Canadian women illustrators
Canadian children's writers
Canadian women children's writers
20th-century Canadian women writers
20th-century Canadian writers
20th-century Canadian artists
20th-century Canadian women artists